Day Wave is an American indie rock project from Oakland, California, formed in 2014. The band, based around musician Jackson Phillips, with accompanying musicians for live performances, released their debut EP Headcase in 2015. Day Wave has been featured in  LA Mag and Billboard. They opened for Blonde Redhead during their fall 2016 tour.

In November 2016, Day Wave signed onto Harvest Records and released the single "Wasting Time". The song "Hard to Read" appears in 2016 video game Watch Dogs 2. In February 2017, Day Wave announced its debut album, The Days We Had, which was released on May 5, 2017. Phillips relocated to the Echo Park neighborhood of Los Angeles in early 2017. Like on his earlier EPs, Phillips recorded straight to tape on his full-length debut. Phillips's recordings with Day Wave included some of the earliest recorded work of Australian-American musician Hazel English, and they co-released a cover of Interpol's "PDA." On April 24, 2020, Day Wave released its third EP, Crush.

The touring members of Day Wave include brothers Henry Moser (bass) and Jack Moser (keyboard/synth) as well as Nick de Ryss (drums), and Alex Lasner (guitar). After Phillips co-produced Pete Yorn's album Caretakers, Phillips, de Ryss, Henry Moser joined Yorn's 2019 tour as his backing band.

Discography

Studio albums
 The Days We Had (Harvest, 2017)
 Pastlife (PIAS, 2022)

EPs
 Headcase (Self-released, 2015)
 Hard to Read (Grand Jury, 2016)
 Crush (PIAS, 2020)

References

Indie rock musical groups from California
Musical groups from Oakland, California
Fiction Records artists
Harvest Records artists